The candidate information for the Debenham Ward in Mid-Suffolk, Suffolk, England.

Councillors

2011 Results

2015 Results
The turnout of the election was 71.54%.

See also
Mid Suffolk local elections

References

External links
Mid Suffolk Council

Wards of Mid Suffolk District